Gian Franco Reverberi (born 12 December 1934) is an Italian composer and musician. He worked mainly on the soundtracks for Spaghetti Westerns.

Reverberi was one of the first Italian rock music artists. He also worked with his brother Gian Piero on the song "Last Man Standing" (or "Nel Cimitero di Tucson") from the 1968 soundtrack of Django, Prepare a Coffin (Preparati la bara!) (one of many unofficial sequels to Django), which forms the basis of Gnarls Barkley's hit "Crazy". Both brothers are listed as writers of the song.

Among his other credited film scores are Soldati e capelloni (1967), A Black Veil for Lisa (1968), Chimera (1968), ¡Viva América! (1969), Venus in Furs (1969), La ragazza del prete (1970), Black Turin (1972), Black Magic Rites (1973) and A Policewoman on the Porno Squad (1979). He also worked with Enzo Jannacci and Giorgio Gaber.

External links

References

Living people
Musicians from Genoa
1934 births